Daniel Richard Escobar (April 9, 1964 – December 13, 2013) was an American actor known for playing Mr. Escobar, a teacher on the Disney Channel TV series, Lizzie McGuire. His other television credits include Charmed, Curb Your Enthusiasm, NYPD Blue, and Malcolm in the Middle, amongst others. He died in a Los Angeles hospital on December 13, 2013, from complications resulting from diabetes; he was 49 years old.

Early life and career
He was born in McAllen, Texas. His last role was a waiter in Whitney back in 2011.

Filmography

References

External links

1964 births
2013 deaths
20th-century American male actors
21st-century American male actors
American male film actors
American male television actors
American people of Colombian descent
Deaths from diabetes
Male actors from California